The Sino-Vietnamese War was a brief border war between China and Vietnam in early 1979.

Sino-Vietnamese War may also refer to:
Qin campaign against the Yue tribes (221–214 BC)
Han conquest of Nanyue (111 BC)
Trung sisters' rebellion (40–43 AD)
Lady Triệu Rebellion (248)
Lý Nam Đế Rebellion (543) 
Sui–Former Lý War (602)
Mai Thúc Loan Rebellion (713–723) 
Phùng Hưng Rebellion (791) 
Tĩnh Hải-Southern Han War (930) 
Dương Đình Nghệ Rebellion (931)
2nd Tĩnh Hải-Southern Han War (938) 
Former Lê-Song War (981) 
Lý–Song War (1075–1077)
Mongol invasions of Đại Việt (1257–1288) 
Ming invasion of Đại Ngu (1406–07)
Later Trần revolt (1407–1413)
Lam Sơn uprising (1418–1427)
Naval battle in the Gulf of Tonkin between Yang Yandi and the Lê dynasty (Dương Ngạn Địch) (1682)
Qing invasion of Đại Việt (1789) 
Vietnam War (1955-1975) 
Sino-Vietnamese War (1979)
Sino-Vietnamese conflicts (1979–1991) (including Johnson South Reef Skirmish (1988))

See also
China–Vietnam relations